Macedonia  is an unincorporated community in Warren County, in the U.S. state of Missouri.

Macedonia took its name from a nearby Methodist church, which in turn was named after the Greek region of Macedonia.

References

Unincorporated communities in Warren County, Missouri
Unincorporated communities in Missouri